Gendi Khori-ye Olya (also Romanized as Gendī Khorī-ye ‘Olyā; also known as Gendī Khorī-ye Bālā) is a village in Tut-e Nadeh Rural District, in the Central District of Dana County, Kohgiluyeh and Boyer-Ahmad Province, Iran. At the 2006 census, its population was 96, in 17 families.

References 

Populated places in Dana County